The 1997 Irish presidential election was held on Thursday, 30 October 1997. It was the eleventh presidential election to be held in Ireland, and only the sixth to be contested by more than one candidate. It was held ahead of schedule when incumbent Mary Robinson resigned to assume her new appointment as the United Nations High Commissioner for Human Rights.

Candidates
The Minister for the Environment and Local Government made the order opening nominations on 15 September, with 30 September as the deadline for nominations. Five people received nominations, the highest number contesting to that point, and more remarkably, four of the five were women.

Mary McAleese
Mary McAleese was selected by Fianna Fáil as their candidate for the presidency. Born in Belfast, she was formerly a journalist with broadcaster, RTÉ, and at the time of her nomination, she was Pro-Vice Chancellor of Queen's University Belfast. Two other candidates, Albert Reynolds and Michael O'Kennedy, had also sought the Fianna Fáil nomination. Reynolds was a former Taoiseach while O'Kennedy was a former cabinet minister having served in the Finance and Foreign Affairs portfolios. Both were also sitting TDs which was seen as an advantage. In the first round of voting, Reynolds received 49 votes, McAleese 42, and O'Kennedy 21. In the second round, McAleese won, with 62 votes to Reynolds's 48. McAleese was later also endorsed by the Progressive Democrats, the smaller party in the coalition government with Fianna Fáil.

Mary Banotti
Mary Banotti was nominated by Fine Gael. She was the grand-niece of the former Irish leader, Michael Collins, and sister of the deputy leader of the party, Nora Owen. She defeated colleague Avril Doyle for the party nomination in a very close contest. Banotti, who was an MEP at the time, was the only serving politician among the five presidential candidates.

Adi Roche
Adi Roche, who had founded Chernobyl Children International in 1991, was nominated by the Labour Party. Roche was later endorsed by Democratic Left and the Green Party. At 42 years of age, she was and is the youngest person to stand in an Irish presidential election.

Dana Rosemary Scallon
Dana Rosemary Scallon received the nominations of five county councils: Donegal, Kerry, Longford, North Tipperary and Wicklow. Scallon was a singer, the winner of the 1970 Eurovision Song Contest, and a family values campaigner. She was the first candidate in any Irish presidential election to have been nominated by local authorities, rather than by Oireachtas members.

Derek Nally
Derek Nally was the fifth candidate to join the presidential race and the only male candidate. He was a retired Garda and victims' rights campaigner. He also received the nominations of five county councils: Carlow, Clare, Kildare, South Dublin and Wexford.

Result

Results by constituency

References

1997 elections in the Republic of Ireland
1997 in Irish politics
Presidential elections in Ireland
October 1997 events in Europe